Brainiac 4 is the name of two fictional characters appearing in American comic books published by DC Comics.

Fictional character biography

Pre-Zero Hour/Post-Infinite Crisis

The Silver Age version of Brainiac 4 is Kajz Dox, the father of Querl Dox (Brainiac 5). Kajz Dox dies on the planet Colu when his son Querl is still a young boy.

The supervillain Pulsar Stargrave once claimed to be the father of Brainiac 5, but this is later proven false.
 
After the events of Infinite Crisis and the Legion of Super-Heroes continuity reverting to history similar to that of the Legion before the events of Zero Hour, Brainiac 5's immediate ancestor Brainiac 4 is again shown to be a male. He had taken the name Brainiac 4 after 1000 years to reclaim the name as something that could be admired.

Post-Zero Hour

The second Brainiac 4 first appears in Legion of Super-Heroes #107 (August 1998), where she is not only revealed to be leader of the evil Dark Circle, but also as the long-missing mother of Brainiac 5.

From her birth, she suffered from a lack of emotion, even abandoning her son at his birth in an attempt to find something emotionally stimulating. Living a variety of lives, from beggar woman to hero to gambler, she eventually becomes the leader of a terrorist group known as the Dark Circle and finds something that caused her to feel emotion: sending an entire fleet to its death. Eventually, her son finds her, only to have Brainiac 4 try to kill him in the expectation that, if killing strangers caused her to feel good, killing her son will make her feel better. After being stopped by Gates, she is committed to an asylum.

During the Underworld Unleashed event, Vril Dox II sells the soul of an unspecified 30th century descendant to Neron.

Following the Mark Waid reboot, Brainiac 5's mother is not a villain. She briefly appears as one of a number of Coluans suffering from a sickness that reduces their mental abilities as part of an attack on the United Planets. Dox calls her "Colu's foremost researcher" and mentions her singing him to sleep as a child. She is not referred to as Brainiac 4.

In neither continuity is her real name given, although it can be assumed her surname is "Dox".

In other media
Brainiac 4 appears in the animated film Legion of Super-Heroes, voiced by Robbie Daymond.

Notes

References

DC Comics aliens
DC Comics extraterrestrial supervillains
DC Comics female supervillains
DC Comics male characters
Fictional terrorists